Asia Pacific Gateway (APG) is a submarine communications cable system that connects Mainland China, Hong Kong, Japan, South Korea, Malaysia, Taiwan, Thailand, Vietnam and Singapore.
The capacity will be 54.8 terabits per second. The APG cable consortium includes Facebook, CAT Telecom, China Telecom, China Mobile International, China Unicom, Chunghwa Telecom, KT Corporation, LG Uplus, NTT Communications, StarHub, Global Transit, Viettel and VNPT. The APG cable system was scheduled to be ready for service in 2016.

Cable landing stations 
It will have cable landing points at:
 Mainland China (at Chongming and Nanhui)
 Hong Kong (at Tseung Kwan O)
 Japan (at Shima and Shin Maruyama)
 South Korea (at Busan)
 Malaysia (at Kuantan)
 Taiwan (at Toucheng)
 Thailand (at Songkhla)
 Vietnam (at Da Nang)
 Singapore (at East Coast)

References 

Submarine communications cables in the Pacific Ocean
2016 establishments in Asia
Submarine communications cables in the Indian Ocean